James Henry Heartfield (19 January 1823 – 28 November 1891) was an English cricketer. Heartfield was a right-handed batsman who bowled right-arm roundarm fast. He was born at Mitcham, Surrey.

Heartfield made his first-class debut for Surrey against Sussex at The Oval in 1860. He made nine further first-class appearances for the county, the last of which came against Yorkshire. A bowler, he took 21 wickets at an average of 16.09, with best figures of 6/28. One of two five wicket hauls he took during his career, his best figures came against Sussex in 1860 at the Royal Brunswick Ground, Hove. He also made a single first-class appearance for a New All England Eleven against a New England Eleven in 1862.

He later stood as an umpire in three first-class matches in 1875. He died at Greenwich, London, on 28 November 1891.

References

External links
James Heartfield at ESPNcricinfo
James Heartfield at CricketArchive

1823 births
1891 deaths
People from Mitcham
English cricketers
Surrey cricketers
English cricket umpires
New All England Eleven cricketers